Joseph Friedrich Nicolaus Bornmüller (February 6, 1862 – December 19, 1948) was a German botanist born in Hildburghausen, Thuringia.

Biography 
He studied horticulture in Potsdam, and in 1886 traveled to the Balkans and Greece on his first botanical expedition. In 1887-88 he worked at the botanical garden in Belgrade, and during his subsequent career conducted botanical studies widely throughout the Middle East, Asia Minor and North Africa. In his research, he also visited Greece, Madeira and the Canary Islands.

In 1903 he succeeded Heinrich Carl Haussknecht (1838–1903) as curator of the "Haussknecht Herbarium" at Weimar, a position he maintained until 1938. In 1918 he was awarded an honorary professorship from the University of Jena.

Among Bornmüller's many publications was a treatise on Macedonian flora titled Beiträge zur Flora Mazedoniens (1925–1928).

Eponymy
The plant genus Bornmuellerantha from the family Scrophulariaceae; the plant genus Bornmuellera from the family Brassicaceae; the plant species Allium bornmuelleri, Geocaryum bornmuelleri, and Paronychia bornmuelleri ; the venomous viper species Montivipera bornmuelleri ; and the caecilian species Crotaphatrema bornmuelleri are named in his honor.

References
This article incorporates information based on a translation of an article at the German Wikipedia, whose sources include: Zander, Robert; Encke, Fritz; Buchheim, Günther; Seybold, Siegmund (editors) (1984). Handwörterbuch der Pflanzennamen. 13. Auflage. Stuttgart: Ulmer Verlag. .
HUH Index of Botanists

External links 
 IPNI List of taxa described & co-described by Bornmüller.

19th-century German botanists
People from Hildburghausen
1862 births
1948 deaths
20th-century German botanists
Natural history of Palestine (region)